The following list contains films which were distributed by Walt Disney Studios Motion Pictures internationally by all existing and defunct labels.

All films listed are theatrical releases by Buena Vista Pictures Distribution/Walt Disney Studios Motion Pictures (include Star Distribution (Latin America and Brazil) & Buena Vista International label or Star Studios) unless specified.

 Films labeled with a ‡ symbol signifies a release exclusively through Disney+ or its sister services and content hubs (including Disney+ Hotstar in India).
 Films labeled with a * symbol signifies a release through a third-party streaming service.

Released

1980s

1990s

2000s

2010s

2020s

Upcoming

Undated films

See also
 List of Disney feature-length home entertainment releases
 List of Disney television films
 List of Disney theatrical animated feature films
 List of 20th Century Studios theatrical animated feature films
 List of Disney+ original films
 List of Hollywood Pictures films
 List of Hulu original films
 List of films released by Lucasfilm
 List of Marvel Studios films
 List of Star Studios films
 List of Searchlight Pictures films
 List of 20th Century Studios films
 List of Touchstone Pictures films
 List of Walt Disney Pictures films
 Lists of Walt Disney Studios films
 :Category:Lists of films by studio

Notes

References

Further reading
 List of all films released by Disney regardless of label—Disney D23

External links
 Walt Disney Pictures

2020s in American cinema
Lists of films released by Disney
Lists of 2020s films
American films by studio